Feica is a Pakistani cartoonist who satirises Pakistani politics. He has worked in newspapers and publications of the country, while simultaneously exhibiting his work as a painter and artist since 1979. He is retired and lends his services as an advisor and consultant to various organizations locally and internationally, while also giving visiting lectures at educational institutions.

Early life and family
Feica was born in 1957 in Kabirwala, a town of Khanewal District in the Punjab province of Pakistan. Shortly after birth, his parents along with the rest of his siblings moved to Multan city. 

He married in 1995 and has 3 children. He lives with his family in Karachi.

Education and Career

Feica graduated from National College of Arts, Lahore in 1979 with a degree in Fine Arts and Painting.

In 1979 he joined The Muslim as cartoonist and then The Star in 1980s during the Zia regime. During his time he was intermittently incarcerated for his criticism of the dictatorship, albeit only for short periods. 

While at The Star, he freelanced cartoons for various other publications including Dawn and the Herald. He left The Star in 1986 and joined The Muslim. He joined the Frontier Post in 1987. After working at Frontier Post, he left the country for New York to work with his American counterparts. He stayed at the Columbia University for some time after which he journeyed to the London to work on a project with The Jang Group.  In 1992, soon after returning to Pakistan, he joined Dawn and worked as an Editorial Cartoonist till 2017, moving permanently to Karachi, where he retired from the organization.

In 2001, Feica co-founded a radio station (Mast FM 103). He worked as an advisor and mentor to the organization till 2015.

Causes
Feica has been a supporter of Human Rights and has campaigned for various causes. He has worked with local women's rights movements as well as international causes of peace and conflict. Causes include Pakistan-India Peace Forum, Aman ki Asha. He has also participated in conferences that addressed issues of freedom of speech and media. He has spoken at forums and mainstream media against censorship of journalism in Pakistan.

References 

Pakistani cartoonists
1957 births
Living people